Community nursing is nursing care delivered outside acute hospitals, for example in the home, within General Practice facilities, in community hospitals, in police custody, at a school or in a care home. In the UK, a community nurse needs a degree approved by the Nursing and Midwifery Council, as well as 1–2 years’ experience as a qualified Adult Nurse.

Community health nursing's primary focus is the public/community, in which prevention, promotion, and health maintenance strategies are utilized to help ensure the wellbeing of the entire community. Furthermore, in this type of nursing the client is the community rather than an individual patient. A community can be described as a group of persons who socially interact because of shared goals and interests (McEwen & Nies, 2019).
Reference:
Nies, M. A., & McEwen, M. (2019). Health: A community view. Community/public health nursing: Promoting the health of populations (pp. 1–18). Elsevier.

Being culturally competent is necessary for the community health nurse.  A community may have many different cultures living within the area with different beliefs and traditions.  
It's also important to be aware of the socioeconomic factors in the community.  The socioeconomic status is defined as the combination of economic status, education, occupation and income (Nies & McEwen, 2019).  There may be inconsistencies within the community resources depending on socioeconomic status.  Unfortunately, socioeconomic status is often unevenly distributed in some races and ethnicities.  It's therefore important for a community health nurse to recognize the areas of lower socioeconomic status that may need access to more community resources.

The job functions covered include:
Ambulatory care nursing
Assisted living  These are facilities which assist residents with daily care activities, but not the extent of nursing homes. Residents typically live in their own apartments and common areas are shared throughout the facility. Services offered for residents include: medication administration assistance, 3 prepared meals per day, laundry and cleaning services, personal care assistance, and 24-hour supervision (National Institute on Aging, 2017). Facility compliance to regulations is inspected by the Ohio Department of Health (ODH). ODH is also the licensing body for these health care settings. Each year ODH comes to each facility, unannounced, to complete their survey and inspection (Ohio Department of Health, n.d.). The goal of the inspections is to increase the likelihood that safe and adequate care is being delivered. 
Faith community nursing
Flight nurse
Gerontological nursing Community nursing that focuses on the gerontological population includes providing quick available healthcare resources for the older clients. Most commonly seen are facilities that seniors frequent that provide blood pressure and glucose monitoring. These services may be seen at senior centers, community centers, or at hospitals and clinics. Kennedy and Ramukumba (2020) state that the nurse must be educated in community issues in order to deliver care and meet the patients needs. The nurses working at these facilities that focus on the needs of the elderly must be educated in common issues of the elderly.
Home care
Home health nursing
Hospice home health: When patients have a life expectancy of six months or less, hospice care, which focuses on comfort care, is an option for patients (Nies & McEwen, 2019).  There are different options available to the patient and their family.  Hospice can be initiated in a hospital or within a facility, however hospice can also be initiated in the home setting.  It is important for some patients, especially in certain cultures, to have hospice care and die in their own home as a part of a dignified death(Ahn et al., 2020).  Being a hospice nurse takes more than just typical nursing skills.  Holistic care is necessary, viewing the patient as a whole, not just as their terminal disease (Nies & McEwen, 2019).  There is a large psychological burden that falls onto the nurse, as there are a lot of difficult situations and conversations with the patient and their family.  As mentioned, care focuses on comfort, which often mean pain control and symptom management.  Frequent assessments are necessary to maintain comfort.  It is also important for the nurse to be culturally competent, as different cultures approach death and dying differently.  For example, Mexican Americans prefer to die at home and may have many family members present who insist on helping with care (Nies & McEwen, 2019).  Coordinating care with family and physicians is the best practice when handling home hospice care.
Care Home Nurse
Community Children's Nurse
Community Mental Health Nurse (CMHN)
Community Learning Disability Nurse
Community Midwife
Women's Health in Community Health:  The Role of the Community Midwife
Women's Health has its place in community health.  Women account for 49.6% of the global population.  There are global issues that some women may be prone to experiencing than other women residing in a different part of the world.  For women in a community, it is important to consider various aspects that determines wellbeing.  Different women's health topics include the role of the woman in her community, mental wellbeing, disease prevention, health promotion, nutrition, sexuality, sex, sexual health, sexually transmitted infections, and reproductive health (Alexander, LaRosa,  Bader, H., Garfield, & Alexander, 2017).  The role of the nursing midwife has a large impact on women in the community experiencing pregnancy.
The nursing midwife is responsible for caring for women who are pregnant.  Their duty includes assessing for a healthy pregnancy by ensuring appropriate healthcare management during pregnancy and actively participating in a safe delivery.  Duties of a community midwife includes ensuring the pregnant woman is maintaining health by assessing vital signs and changes in the woman's behavior.  The nurse midwife should assess the fetus for normal growth habits and ensure the appropriate treatments, medications, and diagnostic tests are being completed for close management of the pregnancy.  The nurse midwife provides continuous education for the woman throughout her pregnancy.
Aannestad, Herstad, & Severinsson (2019) concluded that women who have the experience of having a midwife during pregnancy and at birth expressed the need for the role in the community health.  The nurse midwife establishes a relationship whose presence provided security, guidance, support, and expertise (Aannestad et al., 2019).  The role of the community nurse midwife plays a large role in dependable care of pregnant women and safe delivery of the baby.

Correctional Nursing
District Nurse (DN)
General Practice Nurse (GPN)
Health Visitor (HV)
Homeless Outreach Nurse
Nurses working in unscheduled care, e.g. working with paramedics
Occupational Health Nurse
Palliative Care Nurse
Public Health Nurse
Sexual Health Nurse:  Sexual health can be negatively effected by things like physical/mental health, body function and structure, or surgery (Evcili & Demirel, 2018). A sexual health nurse educates patients on the importance of sexual health, safe sex, and preventing STI's and unplanned pregnancies. Nurses in primary care offices should include sexual health in the patient assessment, as sexual health can be an indicator of both emotional and physical health (Evcili & Demirel, 2018). Even though it is important to educate patients on sexual health, many nurses report that they are uncomfortable or do not have enough time to discuss sexual health with patients (Klaeson et al., 2017). Patients need help with their sexual problems, and they expect that health care workers are knowledgeable and can help. There are many nurses available to help and talk to patients about sexual health (Klaeson et al., 2017). 
Military nurse
Nurse-Family Partnership
Private duty nursing The Role of the Private Duty Nursing in Community Health

Private Duty Nursing care is provided in the comfort of a client's home in the community. According to an AARP survey, 76% of Americans age 50 and older say they prefer to remain in their current residence, and 77% would like to stay in their community if possible (Vasold & Binette, 2009).  The private duty nurse manages a client's daily health needs, uses critical thinking skills to assess unfavorable health changes in conditions, and administers treatments and medicines. A private duty nurse communicates with the client's doctor from the community.

The purpose of a Private Duty Nurse is to provide continuous skilled nursing care for clients with complex medical needs if nursing care can be delivered safely in the client's residence. Private duty nursing can be provided by Licensed Practical Nurse and Registered Nurses in most states.  Care provided by license practical nurses must be under the supervision of a Registered Nurse. Private duty nursing services are covered through Medicaid health plans. Clients must have a medical need, a doctor's order, and a face to face encounter documented 90 days before or within 30 days after the start of care (Ohio Department of Medicaid, 2020). 
Nurses who provide private duty nursing services allow patients to remain in the community in their homes. According to the National Private Duty Association, private nursing care is more cost-effective than nursing homes or assisted-living facilities, a trade organization for private medical and nonmedical home care companies. According to data collected by the NPDA, one nursing home resident's average annual cost is $69,715. In contrast, 20 hours a week of home care services cost about $18,000 (Kulikowski, 2011). A private duty nurse's role in enhances the client's quality of life and keeps the client outside the institutional level of care.

School nursing
Telenursing

Ahn, E., Song, I. G., Choi, J. Y., Jho, H. J., Park, I., Sung, S., Shin, S., Park, S. J., Nam, E. J., Jeong, S. H., & Chang, Y. J. (2020). Effectiveness of home hospice care: A nationwide prospective observational study. Supportive Care in Cancer, 28(6), 2713–2719. https://doi.org/10.1007/s00520-019-05091-7
National Institute on Aging. (2017). Residential facilities, assisted living, and nursing homes. https://www.nia.nih.gov/health/residential-facilities-assisted-living-and-nursing-homes
Ohio Department of Health. (n.d.). Residential care facilities - assisted living. https://odh.ohio.gov/wps/portal/gov/odh/know-our-programs/residential-care-facilities-assisted-living/residentialcarefacilitiesassistedliving
Nies, M. A., & McEwen, M. (2019). Community/public health nursing: Promoting the health of populations (7th ed.). Elsevier.

References
Aannestad, M., Herstad, M., Severinsson, E. (2019). A meta-ethnographic synthesis of qualitative 
research on women's experience of midwifery care. Nursing & Health Sciences, 2020 (22), 171–183. DOI: 10.1111/nhs.12714
Alexander, L., LaRosa, J., Bader, H., Garfield, S., Alexander, W.J. (2017). New dimensions in 
women's health. Jones & Bartlett Learning.

Evcili, F., & Demirel, G. (2018). Patient's sexual health and nursing: A neglected area. International Journal of Caring Sciences, 11(2). http://www.internationaljournalofcaringsciences.org/docs/72_evcili_original_10_2.pdf

Kennedy, C., & Ramukumba, M. M. (2020). Systematic and integrative reviews: synthesising evidence for community nursing practice. British Journal of Community Nursing, 25(1), 6–9. https://proxy.ulib.csuohio.edu:2096/10.12968/bjcn.2020.25.1.6

Klaeson, K., Hovlin, L., Guvå, H., & Kjellsdotter, A. (2017). Sexual health in primary health care - a qualitative study of nurses’ experiences. Journal of Clinical Nursing, 26(11-12), 1545–1554. https://doi.org/10.1111/jocn.13454

References

Community nursing